Everybody's All-American is a novel by longtime Sports Illustrated contributor Frank Deford, published in 1981. It was made into a motion picture, directed by Taylor Hackford.

Plot summary
The novel tells the story of a fictional famous college football player at the University of North Carolina at Chapel Hill during the early 1950s. The setting of the novel was changed to a fictional "Louisiana University" for the movie adaptation. The main character, Gavin Grey, wins the Heisman Trophy and then goes on to a professional career, but is sidetracked by alcoholism, failed business ventures, and marital difficulties among other misjudgments.

The novel is narrated by Grey's nephew, Donnie McClure, a historian who has written a biography of Confederate war hero J.E.B. Stuart. During his college career, Grey's heroics are often compared to Stuart's actions. Both are celebrated not only for their actions, but for their gentle behavior and consideration for others around them.

Grey's greatest moments came away from the football field. At a fraternity party, a carelessly placed cigarette ignites the dress of a young woman, who staggers back in fear and nearly starts a much larger fire by lighting a set of drapes. Despite a strong fear of fire, Grey saves the woman by leaping forward and dousing the flames. A few weeks later, Grey, McClure, and a UNC teammate, Lawrence, venture into a black neighborhood where Grey meets Narvel Blue, another one-time football star whose greatness was never realized because of bad grades, segregation, and bad luck. Blue and Grey compare attributes but decide that a foot-race must be held to determine which is the faster runner. Despite falling behind initially, Grey eventually overcomes Blue by a shade at the end of the race.

After a serious knee injury cuts short his professional career, he is miserable in retirement and returns to accept a lesser role with the Baltimore Colts. However, his season, and ultimately his football career, end after a knee injury in his third game. Grey is left calling every team in the NFL, begging for one more chance.

Grey is left to constantly reminisce about his glory days on the football field, boring and embarrassing those around him. His once-gawky and awkward nephew Donnie becomes a respected scholar and biographer, and his beauty queen wife, Babs, becomes a successful career woman. All of Grey's former teammates move toward their life off the gridiron with infinitely more grace, while Narvel Blue overcomes racism in the South to become a successful restaurateur.

As each day passes, Grey falls farther away from his moments of glory. And with each passing day, his relevance, sense of place, and his grasp of the world around him fade until he is diminished to little more than a ghost.

Speculation on sources
Some have said that the main character in the novel is based on Charlie "Choo-Choo" Justice, a real-life North Carolina football star.  Then, after the movie was released, simply because the film had been relocated to Louisiana, there were rumors that Deford had based Gavin Grey on LSU's All-American running back, Billy Cannon.  Deford has always vigorously denied that the character of Gavin Grey was based on any real person, but was, in fact, a composite of many college stars he had known in several sports.  "Never met Justice or Cannon, and hardly knew anything about them." he says.

Critical reception
Kirkus Reviews wrote that "the pathos of the ex-sports star who lives in the past has by now become a book/movie cliche; and Sports Illustrated editor Deford (The Owner) ends up by tossing in just about every ironic, tear-jerking gimmick that goes with the territory."

References

1981 American novels
American novels adapted into films
American football books
American sports novels
Novels set in North Carolina
University of North Carolina at Chapel Hill
Fiction set in the 1950s

it:Un amore una vita
ru:Стопроцентный американец для всех (фильм)